Aoyama (written: 青山 literally "blue mountain") is a Japanese surname. Notable people with the surname include:

Ayari Aoyama, born 1982, Japanese former butterfly swimmer
Gosho Aoyama, born 1963, Japanese manga artist (birthname: Yoshimasa Aoyama)
Hikaru Aoyama, born 1993, Japanese gravure idol and tarento
Hiroshi Aoyama, Japanese motorcycle racer
Jun Aoyama, Japanese footballer
, Japanese manga artist
, Japanese writer
Naoaki Aoyama, Japanese footballer
Shinji Aoyama, born 1964, Japanese film director
Shuhei Aoyama, Japanese motorcycle racer
Shuko Aoyama, Japanese tennis player
Thelma Aoyama, born 1987, Japanese pop singer
Tōko Aoyama, born 1976, Japanese voice actress
Yoshino Aoyama, born 1996, Japanese voice actress
Yutaka Aoyama, Japanese voice actor
Zakuro Aoyama, born 1990, Japanese artist

Fictional characters 
Hajime Aoyama, character in Ghost Stories (anime)
Masaya Aoyama of Tokyo Mew Mew
Motoko Aoyama of Love Hina
Otaki Aoyama, character in the anime/manga series Oh My Goddess!
Shigeharu Aoyama, the main character in the Japanese film, Audition (film)
Shougo Aoyama of Toei Animation's Yu-Gi-Oh! movie (not the movie aired in North America)
Tessan Aoyama, a samurai in a folk version of a Japanese ghost story titled Banchō Sarayashiki
Yuki Aoyama, character in Chance Pop Session
Saborou Aoyama, The Blue Ranger from the 1982 Super Sentai Series Goggle V
Yuga Aoyama, character in My Hero Academia

See also
Aoyama clan

Japanese-language surnames